Bolleberget are ski jumping hills in Bollnäs, Sweden.

History
It was opened in 1964 and owned by Bollnäs GoIF, and closed in 2001. It hosted one FIS Ski jumping World Cup event in 1991 on normal hill.

World Cup

Men

Ski jumping venues in Sweden
Sport in Sweden
Sports venues completed in 1964
1934 establishments in Sweden